Lemybrien is a small village and townland in County Waterford, Ireland. It is on the N25 Cork to Waterford City road. Lemybrien is in the foothills of the Comeragh Mountains, in an area of County Waterford known as "The Déise". As of the 2016 census, the village had a population of 192 people, of whom 104 were male and 88 female.

Sport
Stage 2 of the 1998 Tour de France passed through the area. Kilrossanty GAA sports club is based in Lemybrien.

Archeology
Drumlohan Souterrain and Ogham Stones, a national monument dating to the 5th–9th centuries AD, lies 4 km (2½ mi) to the east.

References

Towns and villages in County Waterford
Townlands of County Waterford